Fatai (born Fatai Veamatahau on 4 June 1995) is a Melbourne, Australia-based singer of Tongan descent. She rose to fame soon after being a semi-finalist on the first season of the Australian version of The Voice. Following her success on The Voice, she signed a deal with Mercury Records Australia. In mid-2015, following two and a half years on the Mercury label, Fatai became an independent artist. Her debut single as an independent artist, "Purple", was released on 16 August 2015, soon followed by her live debut EP, Undone, on 20 November 2015.

History

Early life and career 
Fatai began singing professionally with her family from the age of seven. In 2009, she began a solo career, singing to audiences at various festivals and community events.

2012: The Voice

Performances

2013-present: Post The Voice
Fatai sold out her own first headline tour spanning Australia and New Zealand in 2014.

In 2014, her videos covering Disney's Frozens "Do You Want to Build a Snowman?" found its way to an online audience of many millions of people globally on Facebook and YouTube. Soon after, Fatai was requested to record a studio version of "Do You Want To Build A Snowman?”, which was released as the lead single on Universal Music Australia's Christmas compilation album We Love Disney, in November 2014. 

In 2015, Fatai supplied backing vocals on Guy Sebastian's "Tonight Again" and was the  support act for Sebastian's 2015 arena tour.

Fatai released her debut EP, Undone, on 20 November 2015. 

In 2016, Fatai was invited to be a part of Willow Creek Community Church in Chicago. While being based out of Chicago, she toured in North America for the first time, selling out two shows at Hotel Café in Los Angeles, two shows at Rockwood Music Hall Stage 2 in New York City and Schubas in Chicago.

Discography

Extended plays

Singles

References

External links 

 

1995 births
Living people
Singers from Melbourne
21st-century Australian singers
21st-century Australian women singers